The roots of the reconstructed Proto-Indo-European language (PIE) are basic parts of words that carry a lexical meaning, so-called morphemes. PIE roots usually have verbal meaning like "to eat" or "to run". Roots never occurred alone in the language. Complete inflected verbs, nouns, and adjectives were formed by adding further morphemes to a root and potentially changing the root's vowel in a process called ablaut.

A root consists of a central vowel that is preceded and followed by at least one consonant each. A number of rules have been determined that specify which consonants can occur together, and in which order. The modern understanding of these rules is that the consonants with the highest sonority are nearest to the vowel, and the ones with the lowest sonority such as plosives are furthest away. There are some exceptions to these rules such as thorn clusters.

Sometimes new roots were created in PIE or its early descendants by various processes such as root extensions (adding a sound to the end of an existing root) or metathesis.

Word formation
Typically, a root plus a suffix forms a stem, and adding an ending forms a word.

For example,  "he bears" can be split into the root  "to bear", the suffix  "imperfective aspect" and the ending  "present tense, third person singular".

The suffix is sometimes missing, which has been interpreted as a zero suffix. Words with zero suffix are termed root verbs and root nouns. An example is  "I am". Beyond this basic structure, there is the nasal infix which functions as a present tense marker, and reduplication, a prefix with a number of grammatical and derivational functions.

Finite verbs

Verbal suffixes, including the zero suffix, convey grammatical information about tense and aspect, two grammatical categories that are not clearly distinguished. Imperfective (present, durative) and perfective aspect (aorist, punctual) are universally recognised, while some of the other aspects remain controversial. Two of the four moods, the subjunctive and the optative, are also formed with suffixes, which sometimes results in forms with two consecutive suffixes:  >  "he would bear", with the first  being the present tense marker, and the second the subjunctive marker. Reduplication can mark the present and the perfect.

Verbal endings convey information about grammatical person, number and voice. The imperative mood has its own set of endings.

Nouns and adjectives

Nouns usually derive from roots or verb stems by suffixation or by other means. (See the morphology of the Proto-Indo-European noun for some examples.) This can hold even for roots that are often translated as nouns: , for example, can mean "to tread" or "foot", depending on the ablaut grade and ending. Some noun stems like  "lamb", however, do not derive from known verbal roots. In any case, the meaning of a noun is given by its stem, whether this is composed of a root plus a suffix or not. This leaves the ending, which conveys case and number.

Adjectives are also derived by suffixation of (usually verbal) roots. An example is  "begotten, produced" from the root  "to beget, to produce". The endings are the same as with nouns.

Infinitives and participles
Infinitives are verbal nouns and, just like other nouns, are formed with suffixes. It is not clear whether any of the infinitive suffixes reconstructed from the daughter languages (among others) was actually used to express an infinitive in PIE.

Shape of a root
In its base form, a PIE root consists of a single vowel, preceded and followed by consonants. Except for a very few cases, the root is fully characterized by its consonants, while the vowel may change in accordance with inflection or word derivation. This process is called ablaut, and the different forms are called ablaut grades. The five ablaut grades are the e-grade, o-grade, lengthened e- and o-grades, and the zero-grade that lacks a vowel.

In linguistic works,  is used to stand in for the various ablaut grades that the vowel may appear in. The vowel is flanked on both sides by one or more consonants; the preceding consonants are the onset, the following ones are the coda.

The onset and coda must contain at least one consonant; a root may not begin or end with the ablaut vowel. Consequently, the simplest roots have an onset and coda consisting of one consonant each. Such simple roots are common; examples are:  "to give",  "to bear",  "to put",  "to run",  "to eat",  "sharp",  "to tread",  "to sit", and  "to clothe". Roots can also have a more complex onset and coda, consisting of a consonant cluster (multiple consonants). These include:  "to breathe",  "red",  "to plough",  "straight",  "to bind",  "to freeze",  "to flow",  "to sleep", and  "to moisten". The maximum number of consonants seems to be five, as in  "to twine".

Early PIE scholars reconstructed a number of roots beginning or ending with a vowel. The latter type always had a long vowel ( "to put",  "to grow",  "to give"), while this restriction did not hold for vowel-initial roots ( "to eat",  "to drive",  "to smell"). Laryngeal theory can explain this behaviour by reconstructing a laryngeal following the vowel (resulting in a long vowel) or preceding it (resulting in a short vowel). These reconstructions obey the mentioned rules.

Sonority hierarchy
When the onset or coda of a root contains a consonant cluster, the consonants in this cluster must be ordered according to their sonority. The vowel constitutes a sonority peak, and the sonority must progressively rise in the onset and progressively fall in the coda.

PIE roots distinguish three main classes of consonants, arranged from high to low sonority:

These include three subgroups:
 The sibilant .

The following rules apply:
 A consonant closer to the main vowel must have a higher sonority than the consonant further away. Thus, consonants in the onset must follow the order , and the reverse  in the coda, giving  as the full root shape.
 Only one member of each sonority class may appear in the onset or coda.

Laryngeals can also occur in the coda before a sonorant, as in  "small".

Obstruent clusters
The obstruent slot of an onset or coda may consist of multiple obstruents itself. Here, too, only one member of each subgroup of obstruents may appear in the cluster; a cluster may not contain multiple laryngeals or plosives.

The rules for the ordering within a cluster of obstruents are somewhat different, and do not fit into the general sonority hierarchy:
 A laryngeal may appear before or after any obstruent other than another laryngeal. Examples are  "to grab",  "to fly",  "to dry",  "to pour, rain",  "to awake", and  "to be silent".

In several roots, a phenomenon called s-mobile occurs, where some descendants include a prepended  while other forms lack it.

Further restrictions
PIE abided by the general cross-linguistic constraint against the co-occurrence of two similar consonants in a word root. In particular, no examples are known of roots containing two plain voiced plosives or two glides. A few examples of roots with two fricatives or two nasals ( "to burn",  "to give, to take" etc.) can be reconstructed, but they were rare as well. An exception, however, were the voiced aspirated and voiceless plosives, which relatively commonly co-occurred (e.g.  "to burn",  "to fly"). In particular, roots with two voiced aspirates were more than twice as common than could be expected to occur by chance.

"to stiffen"). Taken together with the abundance of -type roots, it has been proposed that this distribution results from a limited process of voice assimilation in pre-PIE, where a voiceless stop was assimilated to a voiced aspirate, if another one followed or preceded within a root.

Exceptions
Thorn clusters are sequences of a dental plus a velar plosive ( etc.). Their role in PIE phonotactics is unknown. Roots like  "to perish" apparently violate the phonotactical rules, but are quite common.

Some roots cannot be reconstructed with an ablauting , an example being  "to grow, to become". Such roots can be seen as generalized zero grades of unattested forms like , and thus follow the phonotactical rules.

Some roots like  "to sneeze" or  "to duck" do not appear to follow these rules. This might be due to incomplete understanding of PIE phonotactics or to wrong reconstructions. , for example, might not have existed in PIE at all, if the Indo-European words usually traced back to it are onomatopoeias.

Lexical meaning
The meaning of a reconstructed root is conventionally that of a verb; the terms root and verbal root are almost synonymous in PIE grammar. This is because, apart from a limited number of so-called root nouns, PIE roots overwhelmingly participate in verbal inflection through well-established morphological and phonological mechanisms. Their meanings are not always directly reconstructible, due to semantic shifts that led to discrepancies in the meanings of reflexes in the attested daughter languages. Many nouns and adjectives are derived from verbal roots via suffixes and ablaut.

Nevertheless, some roots did exist that did not have a primary verbal derivation. Apart from the aforementioned root nouns, the most important of these were the so-called Caland roots, which had adjectival meaning. They included at least  "red",  "white",  "deep" and  "heavy".

Verbal roots were inherently either imperfective or perfective. To form a verb from the root's own aspect, verb endings were attached directly to the root, either with or without a thematic vowel. The "other" aspect, if it was needed, would then be a so-called "characterised" stem, as detailed in Proto-Indo-European verb. The characterised imperfective stems are often different in different descendants, but with no association between certain forms and the various branches of Indo-European, which suggests that a number of aspects fell together before PIE split up.

Creation of new roots
Roots were occasionally created anew within PIE or its early descendants. A variety of methods have been observed.

Root extensions
Root extensions are additions of one or two sounds, often plosives, to the end of a root. These extensions do not seem to change the meaning of a root, and often lead to variant root forms across different descendants. The source and function of these extensions is not known.

For  'to push, hit, thrust', we can reconstruct:
  > Ancient Greek τύκος (túkos) "hammer", Russian стуκ (stuk) and сту́κать (stúkat´) "knock" and "to knock"
  > English stoke (Germanic k goes back to PIE .)
  > Vedic tudáti "beats"

Sonorant metathesis
When the root contains a sonorant, the zero grade is ambiguous as to whether the sonorant should be placed before the ablaut vowel or after it. Speakers occasionally analysed such roots the "wrong" way, and this has led to some roots being created from existing ones by swapping the position of the sonorant.

An example of such a pair of roots, both meaning "to increase, to enlarge":
  > Gothic wahsjan "to grow", Ancient Greek αὔξω (aúxō) "to increase".
  > Gothic aukan "to increase, to grow", Latin augeō "to increase", Lithuanian áugti "to grow".

Another example concerns the root "sky", which formed a vṛddhi derivative in this way:
  > Ancient Greek Ζεύς (Zeús), Latin diēs "day", Sanskrit dyú "sky, day".
  > Latin dīvus "divine", Old Prussian deiwis, Sanskrit devá "deity".

Back-formations
Sometimes, commonly used words became the template for a new root that was back-formed from the word, different from the root from which the word was originally formed. For example, the ablauting noun  "lifetime" was formed as a u-stem derivative of the root . The oblique stem alternant  was then reinterpreted as the e-grade of a new root, which formed a new neuter s-stem , a formation which is only created from roots.

See also
 Lexikon der indogermanischen Verben ("Lexicon of the Indo-European Verbs", in German), a lexicon of PIE verbal roots

Notes

References

Bibliography

External links

 American Heritage Indo-European Roots Index
 Database query to the online version of Pokorny's PIE dictionary
 Index to the online version of Pokorny's PIE dictionary
 Jonathan Slocum, Indo-European Lexicon  from the University of Texas Linguistic Research Center

Roots
Indo-European